King Oscar II Chapel is a parish church of the Church of Norway in Sør-Varanger Municipality in Troms og Finnmark county, Norway. It is one of the churches for the Sør-Varanger parish which is part of the Varanger prosti (deanery) in the Diocese of Nord-Hålogaland. The stone church was built in a long church style in 1869 by the architect Jacob Wilhelm Nordan (1824–1892). The church seats about 72 people.

History
In 1851, the Norwegian settlement in the Grense Jakobselv area had a strong desire to have its own chapel. However, it was politics that would accelerate the work of construction. In 1826, the demarcation of the Norway–Russia border was completed. However, there were still disagreements between the Norwegian authorities and Russian fishermen on the national border (the Jakobselva river) after that time. After reporting several harsh confrontations between Norwegian and Russian fishermen, the County Governor of Finnmark wanted to let a naval ship from the Royal Norwegian Navy to undertake fisheries surveillance during the months with the heaviest fishing.

The Interior Ministry wanted an independent investigation of the circumstances and sent Lieutenant Commander Georg Heyerdahl (1798–1853) north to familiarize themselves with the case. Heyerdahl did not share the county Governor's views on which solution. He proposed instead to erect a chapel at Grense Jakobselv. A Lutheran chapel would be an indisputable boundary marking, such as the Russian Orthodox chapel in Boris Gleb that had been used for border demarcation in 1826. In 1865 it was decided to build a chapel and parsonage at the border. In the summer of 1869, the new chapel was built and on 26 September the same year, the chapel was consecrated by Waldemar Hvoslef (1825–1906), Bishop of the Diocese of Bjørgvin.

Name
At the same time, he expressed a desire to name the chapel after himself, and so the members of the congregation made a name plate for him that still hangs over the door.

Media gallery

See also
List of churches in Nord-Hålogaland

References

External links

Sør-Varanger
Churches in Finnmark
Stone churches in Norway
19th-century Church of Norway church buildings
Churches completed in 1869
1869 establishments in Norway
Long churches in Norway